Ecyrus pacificus is a species of beetle in the family Cerambycidae. It was described by Linsley in 1942. It is known from Mexico.

References

Pogonocherini
Beetles described in 1942